Rollin' On is the second studio album by the Steve Gibbons Band.

Track listing
All tracks composed by Steve Gibbons; except where indicated
 "Wild Flowers"  
 "Light Up Your Face"  
 "Now You Know Me"  
 "Mr. Jones"  
 "Till The Well Runs Dry"  
 "Tulane" (Chuck Berry)  
 "Cross Me Over The Road"  
 "Till The Fire Burns Out"  
 "Low Down Man"  
 "Right Side of Heaven"
 "Rollin' On"
 "Please Don't Say Goodbye"
 "Tupelo Mississippi Flash" (Jerry Reed)
 "Rounden"

Personnel
The Steve Gibbons Band
Steve Gibbons - guitar, vocals 
Trevor Burton - bass, guitar, vocals
Dave Carroll - guitar  
Bob Lamb - drums 
Bob Wilson - guitar, keyboards, vocals
Technical
Jon Astley - engineer

External links
 Rollin' On on Discogs.com

1977 albums
Polydor Records albums